Tammin may refer to
 Tammin, Western Australia,  a town
 Shire of Tammin, a local government area in Western Australia
Tammin Sursok (born 1983), South African-born Australian actress and singer-songwriter